Cariamiformes (or Cariamae) is an order of primarily flightless birds that has existed for over 60 million years. The group includes the family Cariamidae (seriemas) and the extinct families Phorusrhacidae, Bathornithidae, Idiornithidae and Ameghinornithidae. Though traditionally considered a suborder within Gruiformes, both morphological and genetic studies show that it belongs to a separate group of birds, Australaves, whose other living members are Falconidae, Psittaciformes and Passeriformes.

This proposal has been confirmed by a 2014 study of whole genomes of 48 representative bird species. This analysis shows that the Cariamiformes are basal among extant Australaves, while falcons are next most basal; in combination with the fact that the two most basal branches of Afroaves (New World vultures plus Accipitriformes, and owls) are also predatory, it is inferred that the common ancestor of 'core landbirds' (Telluraves) was an apex predator. However, some researchers like Darren Naish feel that this assessment is biased towards the more well known, predatory representatives of the clade, and indeed at least one form, Strigogyps, appears to have been herbivorous.

The earliest known unambiguous member of this group is early Eocene taxon Paleopsilopterus itaboraiensis. An isolated femur from the Cape Lamb Member of the Lopez de Bertodano Formation, Vega Island, Antarctica was briefly described as a cariamiform femur in 2006. Because of its age and geographic location, it was argued that this unnamed species may have been close to the ancestry of both cariamids and phorusrhacids. However, a subsequent study published by West et al. (2019) reinterpreted this specimen as a fossil of an unnamed large-bodied member of a non-cariamiform genus Vegavis.

Molecular phylogenetic studies have shown that Cariamiformes is basal to the Falconiformes, Psittaciformes and Passeriformes:

References

 
 
Bird orders
Extant Paleocene first appearances
Paleocene taxonomic orders
Eocene taxonomic orders
Oligocene taxonomic orders
Miocene taxonomic orders
Pliocene taxonomic orders
Pleistocene taxonomic orders
Holocene taxonomic orders